Papago may refer to:

 An archaic term for Tohono Oʼodham people
 An archaic term for the language spoken by the Tohono Oʼodham people
 Papago (moth), a genus of geometer moths
 Papago Freeway, I-10 through Phoenix, Arizona
 Papago Freeway Tunnel, a tunnel in Arizona
 Papago Park, a park in Arizona
 Papago, a village in the northern part of the island of Saipan
 Naver Papago, a translation service
 , a ship of the U.S. Navy
 Great Papago Escape, a mass escape by Axis P.O.W.s from an American facility during World War Two